Jon André Røyrane (born 12 December 1983) is a Norwegian footballer.

Røyrane was born in Norheimsund and grew up in Kvinnherad and started his senior career for Norheimsund IL. After the 2005 season he signed for Sandefjord Fotball together with his younger brother Ørjan. He was sold to Løv-Ham Fotball after the 2007 season. He was loaned out to Åsane Fotball in parts of 2008.

After playing for Løv-Ham in Adeccoligaen in 2009, Røyrane joined Lyn ahead of the 2010 season, but left for Kristiansund when Lyn was bankrupted halfway through the season.

Ahead of the 2012 season, Røyrane joined UMF Selfoss, and became the fourth Norwegian in the Icelandic club. On 10 May 2012, Røyrane scored his first goal for Selfoss against Valur where he showed great technique and skills.

Røyrane signed for Fram Reykjavik in the summer of 2013, but left the club when the season ended. He went back to Norway and played for Stord IL. Currently he is assistant coach in Stord.

References

1983 births
Living people
People from Kvam
People from Kvinnherad
Norwegian footballers
Sandefjord Fotball players
Eliteserien players
Løv-Ham Fotball players
Norwegian First Division players
Åsane Fotball players
Lyn Fotball players
Kristiansund BK players
Jon Andre Royrane
Knattspyrnufélagið Fram players
Norwegian expatriate footballers
Expatriate footballers in Iceland
Norwegian expatriate sportspeople in Iceland
Association football midfielders
Sportspeople from Vestland